Lefevrea signata is a species of leaf beetle of the Democratic Republic of the Congo, described by Julius Weise in 1924.

References 

Eumolpinae
Beetles of the Democratic Republic of the Congo
Taxa named by Julius Weise
Beetles described in 1924
Endemic fauna of the Democratic Republic of the Congo